Strathclyde RC v Wallace [1998] 1 WLR 259 is a UK labour law case concerning indirect discrimination and equal pay.

Facts
Teachers wanted equal pay as head teachers when they had to ‘act up’ or fill in for the heads (even though they were not formally appointed). Most of the teachers who acted up were in fact men.

The Tribunal held the women did have a claim, even though none of the factors relied were discriminatory (acting up teachers also being men). The EAT overruled, and the women claimants were unsuccessful on appeal.

Judgment
The House of Lords refused the teachers' claim. Lord Browne-Wilkinson said ‘the purpose of the section 1 of the Equal Pay Act is to eliminate sex discrimination in pay not to achieve fair wages’.

See also

UK labour law
UK employment equality law

Notes

References

United Kingdom labour case law
House of Lords cases
1998 in case law
1998 in British law